Stabsarzt (short: StArzt or SA), in English Staff Surgeon, is a military commissioned officer rank in German speaking armed forces. In the German Bundeswehr and the former Wehrmacht and Reichswehr, it describes a qualified or licensed surgeon or dentist who practises military medicine, with a rank equal to captain (German: Hauptmann) in the army and the air force or lieutenant (German: Kapitänleutnant) in the navy. In the Austrian and Swiss armies, the rank is Hauptmann.

This rank corresponds to NATO code OF2, and is known in English as captain (Dr.) for army or air force officers or lieutenant (Dr.) for naval officers. The rank was historically also used in the Austro-Hungarian Common Army and corresponded to major or the NATO code OF-3, known as major (Dr.) in English.

The German word Arzt is the general term for a medical practitioner in German. In English the word surgeon in a military context is applied to any medical practitioner, due to the historical evolution of the term, and does not refer exclusively to the modern specialty of surgery. Thus the title is translated as Staff Surgeon in English. The rank of Staff Surgeon has also existed in English-speaking countries; it was used in the Royal Navy of the United Kingdom until 1918.

Holders of this rank are commissioned officers; in practice their authority is often limited to medical matters and medical staff (such as other doctors, nurses and other medics working under their supervision). Under international humanitarian law (specifically the First and Second Geneva Conventions) they are regarded as neutral non-combatants and accorded the status of "protected persons" when participating in humanitarian work during armed conflicts, such as caring for the sick or wounded. They may wear the red cross as a protective sign. As such, they may not be attacked, harmed or taken as prisoners of war (attacking medical personnel is a war crime), and are entitled under the Geneva Conventions to carry out their work without being inhibited. They may be armed, usually with service pistols, strictly for defensive purposes, including self defense and the defense of patients.

Germany

Bundeswehr
In the Joint Medical Service of the German Bundeswehr Stabsarzt (en: Staff surgeon), Stabsapotheker (en: Staff pharmacist), and Stabsveterinär (en: Staff veterinary) are comparable in NATO to the OF-2 ranks Hauptmann, and  Kapitänleutnant. The grades belong to the captain rank group (de: Hauptleute).

Address
The manner of formal addressing of military surgeons/dentists with the rank Stabsarzt is, "Herr/Frau Stabsarzt"; with the rank Stabsapotheker, "Herr/Frau Stabsapotheker"; with the rank Stabsveterinär, "Herr/Frau Stabsveterinär". Although the grammatically female form of Arzt is Ärztin, the military does not have separate gendered ranks, so the correct form of address for a female doctor is "Frau Stabsarzt" and not "Frau Stabsärztin".

Rank insignias
On the shoulder straps (Heer, Luftwaffe) there are three silver stars and the career insignia (de: Laufbahnabzeichen) as symbol of the medical standing, or course of studies. The piping on shoulder straps shows the Waffenfarbe (en: corps- or troop-function colour), corresponding to the appropriate military service, branch, or special force. The corps colour of the "Bundeswehr Joint Medical Service" is dark blue.

In the Marines, the career insignia is in the middle of both sleeves, 3 cm above the cuff strips, and on the shoulder straps between strips and button.

Wehrmacht

Stabsarzt of the German Wehrmacht was comparable to the Hauptmann / Kapitänleutnant (OF-2), as well as to the Hauptsturmführer and Hauptmann of the Waffen-SS.

During wartime, the regular assignment of a Stabsarzt was the management of a main dressing station (German: Hauptverbandsplatz), maintained by the 2nd platoon of the medical company, and supported by first lieutenants (Dr.), second lieutenants (Dr.), and help surgeons (German: Ober-, Assistenz-, and Hilfsärzte). A Stabsarzt also could serve in a variety of other roles.

In line to the so-called Reichsbesoldungsordnung (en: Reich's salary order), appendixes to the Salary law of the German Empire (de: Besoldungsgesetz des Deutschen Reiches) of 1927 (changes 1937 – 1940), the comparative ranks were as follows: C 7
Hauptmann (Heer and Luftwaffe)
Kapitänleutnant (Kriegsmarine)
Stabsarzt (medical service of the Wehrmacht)
Marinestabsarzt, introduced June 26, 1935 (medical service of the Kriegsmarine)
Stabsveterinär (veterinarian service of the Wehrmacht)

The corps colour of the military Health Service Support (HSS) in German armed forces was traditional dark blue, and of the veterinarian service . This tradition was continued by the medical service corps in Heer and Luftwaffe of the Reichswehr and Wehrmacht.

Kriegsmarine 
Rank designations of the Kriegsmarine as to Match 30, 1934, are contained in the table below.

Austria-Hungary

In the Austro-Hungarian Common Army (de: Gemeinsame Armee or k.u.k. Armee) there were the OF2-ranks Regimentsarzt I. Klasse and Regimentsarzt II. Klasse (en: Regiment surgeon 1st class / – 2nd class) until 1918, equivalent to the OF2-rank Stabsarzt in Germany. That particular rank was comparable to the Hauptmann/Captain OF2-rank as well.

References

Military ranks of Germany
Military ranks of Austria
Austro-Hungarian Army
Military medicine